Sheikh Ijlin is a neighborhood in southern Gaza City near the coastal road.

On 18 November 2002, the Israeli Defense Forces (IDF) attacked the neighborhood, destroying the offices of the Preventive Security Force of the Palestinian National Authority.

References

Bibliography
 (visit in 1863: p. 214)

External links
SWP map 19, IAA
SWP map 19, Wikimedia commons

Neighborhoods of Gaza City